Disney Junior was a British and Irish pay television kids channel that was owned by Disney–ABC Television Group that focused on preschool programming. It was launched on 29 September 2000 as Playhouse Disney. The channel was rebranded as Disney Junior on 7 May 2011, it later ceased broadcasting on 30 September 2020.

History

Early History
During the rebrand of Disney Channel in 1997, a block titled "Disney Channel Underfives" was added, featuring programming aimed towards a young audience.

On September 28, 1999, it was rebranded as Playhouse Disney (thus expanding the Playhouse Disney brand outside the US) with the introduction of live presentation.

Launch as a dedicated channel

On September 29, 2000, Disney Television International launched Playhouse Disney as a standalone channel alongside Toon Disney and Disney Channel +1 on the Sky Digital platform. Since the channel was exclusive to Sky Digital at this time, the Playhouse Disney block continued to broadcast on Disney Channel during school-term weekdays. Playhouse Disney was later launched on NTL and Telewest in 2002 and 2003 respectively. The Playhouse Disney block later reduced its hours of programming featured and was eventually disposed of in July 2004.

Transition to standard network
On 28 February 2006, Disney Media Networks and BSkyB announced that Playhouse Disney, in addition to its sister channel Disney Channel would cease as premium add-ons and transition to basic TV packages such as Sky's "Kids Mix" beginning on March 16, and that a new sister channel - Disney Cinemagic would take over Disney's premium offerings, replacing Toon Disney. The transition of Playhouse to a basic network led to a significant broadcast share increase of 83% by July.

In June 2006, a Playhouse Disney block was added to the morning schedule of ABC1. It was removed after Disney ceased transmission of ABC1 in September 2007. ABC1's slot itself on Sky would be used to launch a 25-minute timeshift of Playhouse Disney in October 2007.

Disney Junior Relaunch
On 29 January 2011, it was announced that Playhouse Disney would rebrand as Disney Junior on 7 May, as part of a worldwide rebranding. On the date of the rebrand, the channel transitioned to airing in a 16:9 widescreen ratio.

On 21 February 2013, Sky and Disney Channels Worldwide announced that a high-definition simulcast of Disney Junior would launch on Sky in May.

In September 2017, Disney XD +1 was turned into a pop-up channel titled Mickey and Pals, which aired various programming from Disney Junior.

Closure
Disney Junior, along with its sister channels Disney XD and Disney Channel, closed in the UK on 30 September 2020, after 20 years on-air, due to Disney failing to reach a new carriage deal with Sky and Virgin Media. The closure was previously announced on 25 June that year; all of the channels' content were transferred to Disney's streaming service, Disney+.

The final programme to be broadcast before it ceased operations was Gigantosaurus (specifically the episodes "The Floating Stone/The Light in the Storm"). It then showed a selection of promos and advertisements and a music video from Vampirina. Following a good morning song on the channel, it was officially shut down after cutting to a still image featuring Mickey Mouse in his Roadster Racer getup holding a trophy, alongside Animal (as his Muppet Babies form) and Vee from Vampirina.

Virgin Media removed the channels a day before their closure on 29 September, with CBBC and CBeebies taking over the network's former Sky EPG slots on 1 October.

References

Disney television channels in the United Kingdom
Children's television channels in the United Kingdom
Television programming blocks in Europe
Television channels and stations established in 2000
1999 establishments in Ireland
1999 establishments in the United Kingdom
2020 disestablishments in Ireland
2020 disestablishments in the United Kingdom
Television channels and stations disestablished in 2020
UK and Ireland
Defunct television channels in the United Kingdom
Television channel articles with incorrect naming style
Television stations in Malta